Phylomictis eclecta is a moth in the family Depressariidae. It was described by Alfred Jefferis Turner in 1906. It is found in Australia, where it has been recorded from Queensland.

The wingspan is about 18 mm. The forewings are white finely irrorated with grey and with a large oval grey spot on the dorsum at one-fourth. The hindwings are grey.

References

Moths described in 1906
Phylomictis